Erucin (4-methylthiobutyl isothiocyanate) is a dietary isothiocyanate present in cruciferous vegetables that is considered a potential cancer chemopreventive nutraceutical.

Characteristics 

Erucin is produced by the enzymatic hydrolysis of the glucosinolate glucoerucin present in Eruca sativa Mill. seeds (Brassicaceae or Cruciferae). Erucin has structural analogies with sulforaphane (SFN), an isothiocyanate derived from glucoraphanin, a glucosinolate present in some edible crucifers, and known in the literature for its chemopreventive properties. Different isothiocyanates exert anticancer properties on many tumor types (liver, breast, bladder, lung, and pancreatic), and in particular, SFN is employed in a pilot randomized controlled clinical trial in advanced pancreatic cancer.

References 

Isothiocyanates
Cancer